Laredo is an unincorporated rural community in Hill County, Montana, United States. The elevation is 2,644 feet. Laredo is located at latitude 48.431 and longitude -109.883. It is located on U.S. Route 87, 13 miles south of Havre.

Demographics

Notes

Unincorporated communities in Hill County, Montana
Unincorporated communities in Montana